Clube Desportivo Carapinheirense  is a Portuguese sports club from Carapinheira.

The men's football team plays in the AF Coimbra league. The team played in the Campeonato de Portugal, then the third tier of Portuguese football, in the 2013–14, 2016–17 and 2020–21 seasons. The team also contested the Taça de Portugal in those seasons.

References

Football clubs in Portugal
Association football clubs established in 1959
1959 establishments in Portugal